Jashn-e-Adab (Sahityotsav) is a society for poetry and literature which has been established in 2012 to promote and preserve the literary heritage of Hindi and Urdu language through ‘Jashn-e-Adab poetry festival’. 

The aim of these festivals is to celebrate and cherish the indigenous cultural heritage through Mushairas- poetry symposiums, Ghazal singing, Daastangoi-conventional way of story telling, Plays, Bait-bazi, Kathak dance, Qwwali etc. These festivals have lined up acclaimed writers, poets, theater artists, singers, scholars, journalists and critics from across the globe and generations, and has provided platform to fresh litterateurs along with luminaries.

Jashn-e-Adab (Sahityotsav) has tried to raise awareness towards the contemporary situation of art and literature in society and also on its impact through debates, seminars, paper presentations and panel discussions with dignitaries of different fields. Jashn-e-Adab (Sahityotsav) also organizes book exhibitions and provide the platform for release of books written by budding writers. Jashn-e-Adab also confers annual awards and accolades to the literary dignitaries to celebrate and acknowledge their unabating love & services to any form of literature.

History 
Jashn-e-Adab (Sahityotsav) Poetry festivals have been organised in two phases annually as a three-day event each in cities across country wherein Delhi has been the prime centre.  These festivals also witness various sessions of panel discussions to enlighten the audience about the history and the contemporary situation of theatre, films and literature and their role. These sessions are attended and curated by eminent writers, scholars, historians, films and theatre artists from the country and abroad.

Notable participants 

 Karan Singh
 Ashok Chakradhar
 Abhigyan Prakash
 Piyush Mishra
 Irshad Kamil
 Pankaj Tripathi
 Ali Fazal
 Gopichand Narag
 Prof Shamim Hanfi
 Javed Akhtar
 Muzaffar Ali
 Shamsur Rahman Faruqi
 Nida Fazli
 Rahat Indori
 Tom Alter
 Prof Seyed E Hasnain

References 

Poetry festivals in India
Literary societies